Big Spring is a ghost town in Wilson County, Tennessee, United States.

Notable people
Jourdon Anderson, American slave

Notes

Ghost towns in Tennessee
Populated places in Wilson County, Tennessee